Valentin Ionuț Costache (born 2 August 1998) is a Romanian professional footballer who plays as a winger or as an attacking midfielder for Liga I club Rapid București.

Club career

Dinamo București
Costache joined the youth setup of Dinamo București from hometown club CSȘ Videle in 2014. On 20 December the following year, he made his senior debut by coming on as a 62nd-minute substitute for Bogdan Gavrilă in a 1–1 Liga I draw against CFR Cluj. On 14 February 2016, he netted the only goal of a match against Botoșani in the same competition.

Costache was loaned out to second division side Afumați for the 2016–17 campaign, where he managed to score six goals from 23 games all competitions comprised. On 30 July 2017, he scored his first Dinamo goal upon his return to Bucharest in a 1–0 away victory over Liga I defending champions Viitorul Constanța.

CFR Cluj
During early November 2017, it was reported that Costache would be joining CFR Cluj in the approaching transfer window for a fee of €1 million. He was formally unveiled at his new team on 8 January 2018.

Over the course of four and a half seasons in Cluj-Napoca, Costache amassed totals of 145 games and 15 goals in all competitions, and also aided to seven domestic honours.

Rapid București
On 16 June 2022, Costache was transferred to fellow Liga I team Rapid București.

Career statistics

Club

Honours
Dinamo București
Cupa României runner-up: 2015–16

CFR Cluj
Liga I: 2017–18, 2018–19, 2019–20, 2020–21, 2021–22
Supercupa României: 2018, 2020; runner-up: 2019, 2021

References

External links

1998 births
Living people
People from Teleorman County
Romanian footballers
Association football wingers
Association football midfielders
Liga I players
Liga II players
FC Dinamo București players
CS Afumați players
CFR Cluj players
FC Rapid București players
Romania youth international footballers
Romania under-21 international footballers